This is  a list of books by British hard science fiction, Lovecraftian horror,  and space opera author Charles Stross.

Bibliography

Stand-alone novels 
 Scratch Monkey (released, 1993; published, 2011) available online
 Accelerando (2005) available online
 Glasshouse (2006)
 Palimpsest (2011 novella)
 The Rapture of the Nerds (2012, collaboration with Cory Doctorow)

Eschaton series 
 Singularity Sky (2003)
 Iron Sunrise (2004)
Stross has announced that he is unlikely to write a third book in this series.

The Laundry Files 

A series of science fiction spy thrillers about Bob Howard (a pseudonym taken for security purposes), a one-time I.T. consultant, now field agent working for British government agency "the Laundry", which deals with occult threats. Influenced by Lovecraft's visions of the future, and set in a world where a computer and the right mathematical equations is just as useful a tool-set for calling up horrors from other dimensions as a spell-book and a pentagram on the floor.
 The Atrocity Archives (2004)
 Also contains the extra story The Concrete Jungle, set about a year after the main story. Best Novella winner, 2005 Hugo Awards
 The Jennifer Morgue (2006,  – set around three years after The Concrete Jungle)
 Also contains the extra story Pimpf, set within a year of the main story
 The Fuller Memorandum (2010,  – set about eight years after The Atrocity Archives)
 The Apocalypse Codex (2012 – set about nine months after The Fuller Memorandum)
 The Rhesus Chart, (2014)
 The Annihilation Score (2015)
 The Nightmare Stacks (2016)
 The Delirium Brief (2017)
 The Labyrinth Index (2018)
 Escape from Yokai Land (2022)

Tales of the New Management 
Tales of the New Management is a spin-off from the main series, set after CASE NIGHTMARE GREEN.

 Dead Lies Dreaming (2020)
 Quantum of Nightmares (2022)
 Season of Skulls (planned for January 2023)

Novellas
 Down on the Farm (2008 novelette – set about two years after Pimpf) available online
 Overtime (2009 novelette – set about five months after The Fuller Memorandum) available online
 Equoid (2013 novelette – Takes place after the events of Down on the Farm, before the events of The Fuller Memorandum) available online

Game
Stross also authorised, but did not write, an official role-playing game, The Laundry (2010, Gareth Hanrahan, published by Cubicle 7) and a number of supplements based on the "Bob Howard – Laundry" series. The system uses an adaptation of the Call of Cthulhu RPG rules (under licence from Chaosium).

The Merchant Princes series 
The Merchant Princes is a series in which some humans have an ability to travel between parallel Earths, which have differing levels of technology.  This series is science fiction, even though it was originally marketed by the publisher as fantasy. It was originally intended to be a trilogy, but at the end the writing of the first novel, the publisher requested that it be split for shorter length, and this length carried over to the other novels.
The first three books were collectively nominated for and won the Sidewise Award for Alternate History in 2007.
 The Family Trade (2004)
 The Hidden Family (2005)
 The Clan Corporate (2006)
 The Merchants' War (2007)
 The Revolution Business (2009)
 The Trade of Queens (2010)
 Empire Games (2017)
 Dark State (2018)
 Invisible Sun (2021)

The first six books were later re-edited back into the originally intended form as three longer novels. The new books were released in the UK beginning in April 2013, and in DRM-free format in the United States in January 2014.
 The Bloodline Feud  (contains The Family Trade and The Hidden Family)
 The Traders' War  (contains The Clan Corporate and The Merchants' War)
 The Revolution Trade  (contains The Revolution Business and The Trade of Queens)

In January 2013 Tor announced a new Merchant Princes trilogy. The first volume in the series, Empire Games, was issued in January 2017. The second, Dark State, was published in January 2018. The third, Invisible Sun, was published in September 2021.

Halting State series 
Science-fiction/crime novels set 'fifteen minutes in the future' which concentrate on life in the early 21st century, which are centered in Edinburgh in an independent Scotland, and how innovations in policing, surveillance, economics, computer games, the internet, memes and other inventions may change our lives in the future.  Both novels are told in second-person viewpoint. The series was originally planned to be a trilogy but Stross claimed his current plot idea were mooted by the Snowden revelations and he was no longer planning a third book.
 Halting State (2007)
 Rule 34 (2011) (takes place 5 years after Halting State)
 The Lambda Functionary (was planned for 2014, but plans cancelled in 2013)

Saturn's Children series 
Stross's space opera series, featuring the android society that develops after the extinction of humanity.  Stross has referred to the setting for these stories as the "Freyaverse."
 Saturn's Children (2008)
  "Bit Rot", short story in Engineering Infinity (2010)
 Neptune's Brood (2013)

Omnibus titles 
The Science Fiction Book Club has published omnibus editions in the US that combine two books, without new material.
 Timelike Diplomacy (2004; combines Singularity Sky and Iron Sunrise)
 On Her Majesty's Occult Service (2007, combines The Atrocity Archives and The Jennifer Morgue)

Collections 
 Toast: And Other Rusted Futures (2002) available online, containing
 "Toast: A Con Report” (Interzone, August 1998)
 “Extracts from the Club Diary” (Odyssey 3, 1998)
 “Ship of Fools” (Interzone 98, June 1995)
 “Dechlorinating the Moderator” (Interzone 101, 1996)
 “Yellow Snow” (Interzone 37, July 1990)
 “Lobsters” (Asimov’s SF Magazine, June 2001); Best Novelette nominee, 2002 Hugo Awards
 "Antibodies" (Interzone 157, July 2000)
 "Bear Trap" (Spectrum SF 1, January 2000)
 "A Colder War" (Spectrum SF 3, August 2000) available online
 Wireless: The Essential Charles Stross (2009), containing
 "Rogue Farm" (Live Without a Net, 2003, edited by Lou Anders)
 "Unwirer" with Cory Doctorow (ReVisions, 2004 edited by Julie E. Czerneda and Isaac Szpindel)
 "MAXOS"
 "Missile Gap" (One Million A.D., 2005, edited by Gardner Dozois)
 "Snowball's Chance" (Nova Scotia: New Scottish Speculative Fiction, 2005, edited by Neil Williamson and Andrew J. Wilson)
 "Trunk and Disorderly" (Asimov's Science Fiction, 2007)
 "Down on the Farm" (Tor.com, 2008) available online
 "Palimpsest"; Best Novella winner, 2010 Hugo Awards

 Short fiction 
 Halo (2002, novelette)
 Missile Gap (2007, ; novella) available online
 "Minutes of the Labour Party Conference 2016" (2007, short story in the Glorifying Terrorism anthology)
 "A Bird in Hand" (2011, short story in the Fables from the Fountain anthology; 1st ed., NewCon Press, 2011; 2nd ed., NewCon Press, 2018 )
 "A Tall Tail" (2012, short story), available online

 Non-fiction 
 The Web Architect's Handbook'' (1996)

References

External links
Summary bibliography at ISFDB

Bibliographies by writer
Bibliographies of British writers
Science fiction bibliographies